

Features
Paraguay is notable for its history, culture and ecology.

National Parks/Reserves
 Médanos del Chaco National Park
 Lagoon Inmakata National Park
 Ganso National Park
 Riacho Yacaré Ecological Reserve
 Pozo Hondo Ecological Reserve
 Scientific Pirizal Reserve
 Yacaré National Park
 Estero Milagro National Park
 Laguna Blanca Ecological Reserve
 Cerro Sarambí National Park

The country appeals to ecotourism because of its plant and animal diversity.  Paraguay offers cultural diversity, with a variety of ecosystems, shared with neighboring countries. It offers the opportunity to see a diversity of wildlife in both public and private places.

Flora

The flora consists of an estimated 13,000 native species including trees, shrubs, herbs and epiphytic species as well as orchids.

There are approximately 20,000 species; this includes the native and exotic and 280 native endangered species.

The most valuable tree species in the native forests are: lapacho, perobá, yvyrapytá, Bay Cedar, incense. The tree that is emblematic of Paraguay is the lapacho.

The forest zone is a major natural resource. Better controls are needed to avoid deforestation, since it endangers the country's unique species; nevertheless there are several national parks such as National Park Ybycuí To 160 km Asunción 50 square kilometres of subtropical forest.

The National Defensores del Chaco covers an area of 7400 square kilometres.

Fauna
There are 13000 species of vertebrates and fish, amphibians, reptiles, birds, mammals, invertebrates, shellfish and shellfish or insects.

The species of wildlife threatened with extinction are: Jaguar, yaguareté, tapirs, mboreví, bare-throated bellbird, red parrot, harpy eagle or taguato, anteater or jurumí, giant armadillo or tatú cart, lies and others. 
  
Rivers provide surubí, gold and pacú.

Protected wildlife areas

Tatí Yupí, Itabo, Carapa Refuge and Mbaracayu Refuge reserves are driven by Itaipu. In addition are those of the entity Yacyretá, Antiguy, Yabebyry.

Paraguay currently has 42 protected wildlife areas: 
 Defensores del Chaco National Park
 Tte. Agripino Enciso National Park
 Río Negro National Park
 Natural Monument Hill Chovoreca
 Nature Reserve Cabrera - Timane
 Tinfunqué National Park
 Paso Bravo National Park
 Serrania San Luis National Park
 Bella Vista National Park
 Cerro Corá National Park
 Book Resources Managed San Rafael
 Caaguazú National Park
 Resources Managed Ybytyruzú
 Ybycuí National Park
 Park Ypoa National Lake
 Yabebyry Wildlife Refuge
 Natural Monument Macizo Acahay
 Kuri`y National Reserve
 National Park Ñacunday
 National Park Lake Ypacaraí
 Natural Monuments Cerros Köi and Chororí
 Monument Scientific S. Moses Bertoni

Private Reserves
 Mbaracayú Forest Nature Reserve
 Arroyo Blanco Nature Reserve
 Morombí Nature Reserve
 Ypety Nature Reserve

Other reserves

 Mbaracayu Refuge
 Reserve Limoy
 Reserve Itabo
 Pikyry Refuge
 Tatí Yupí Refuge
 Wildlife Refuge Yacyretá

References 
 La magia de mi tierra. Fundación en Alianza. 2007

External links
 Salvemoslos

Tourism in Paraguay
Geography of Paraguay